The 10th AARP Movies for Grownups Awards, presented by AARP the Magazine, honored films released in 2010 made by people over the age of 50 and were announced on January 14, 2011. The ceremony was hosted by actors Dana Delany and Peter Gallagher on February 7, 2011 at the Beverly Wilshire Hotel in Los Angeles. Robert Redford was the winner of the annual Career Achievement Award, and Helen Mirren won the award for Breakthrough Achievement for her performance in Red.

Awards

Winners and Nominees

Winners are listed first, highlighted in boldface, and indicated with a double dagger.

Career Achievement Award
 Robert Redford: "a film icon who has captivated audiences for decades with stellar performances in countless films including The Way We Were, All the President's Men and The Natural, and Oscar-winning directing in Ordinary People."

Breakthrough Accomplishment
 Helen Mirren: "The First Lady of the Cinema, playing a spy forced out of retirement, kicks a heap of bad-guy butt. Best moment: at the trigger of a machine gun the size of a Buick."

Films with multiple nominations and wins

References

AARP Movies for Grownups Awards
AARP
AARP